The Science of Identity Foundation (SIF) is a Hindu Gaudiya Vaishnavite Yoga religious organization based in Hawaii, United States, founded by Chris Butler (also known by his Vaishnavite name Siddhaswarupananda Goswami) in 1977.

Early history

Butler gained followers after founding the Haiku Meditation Center in 1969. He joined the International Society for Krishna Consciousness (ISKCON) in 1970, but after the death of ISKCON founder A. C. Bhaktivedanta Swami Prabhupada, Butler broke away from ISKCON and founded SIF.

SIF was initially known as the Hari Nama or Holy Name Society.  In 1977, Butler estimated the group had 1,000 devotees throughout the world. Butler had a late-night television show called "Chris Butler Speaks" on Hawaii's Channel 13 in the 1980s.

Theology
The organization combines the teaching of yoga and other aspects of Krishnaite Vaishnava Hinduism. Although grounded in Hinduism, Butler has asserted that SIF philosophy of Bhakti yoga "does not conflict with Christianity, with Islam, with any bona fide religious system. We're trying to teach the essence of Bhakti yoga without having anybody say 'Oh that's Hindu' or 'Oh that's Christian'."  The teachings are similar to those of Prabhupada:  that human beings are "sparks" of God whose sole purpose is to please the Lord.

Followers must practice vegetarianism and are not allowed to drink alcohol, smoke, have illicit sex, or gamble.

Notable people
Tulsi Gabbard, the first Hindu member of the United States Congress (specifically the US House of Representatives), is a direct disciple of Chris Butler.

References

External links 
 

Hindu organizations based in the United States
Organizations based in Hawaii
International Hindu organizations
Yoga organizations
Hindu new religious movements
Religious organizations established in 1977
1977 establishments in Hawaii
International Society for Krishna Consciousness
Gaudiya Vaishnavism